"I Miss You" is a song performed by N II U. The song is the closing track on the group's eponymous debut album and was issued as the album's second single. It was the group's only hit on the Billboard Hot 100, peaking at #22 in 1994.

Music video
The official music video for the song was directed by Lionel C. Martin.

Chart positions

Weekly charts

Year-end charts

References

External links
 

1993 songs
1994 singles
Arista Records singles
Music videos directed by Lionel C. Martin
N II U songs
Songs written by Vincent Herbert